Concetta Tomei (born December 30, 1945) is an American theatre, film and television character actress, best known for her roles as Major Lila Garreau on the ABC series China Beach (1988–1991) and as Lynda Hansen on the NBC series Providence (1999–2002).

Early life and education
Tomei was born in Kenosha, Wisconsin. She earned a degree in education from the University of Wisconsin–Madison and worked four years as a teacher before deciding to pursue her love of theatre at the Goodman School of Drama at the Art Institute of Chicago (now at DePaul University). She earned a BFA and moved to Houston, Texas, where she worked for the Alley Theatre for two years before moving to New York City. In the Milwaukee area, she studied at Sunset Playhouse with Alan Furlan.

Career
Tomei appeared in the original cast of several pioneering Off-Broadway productions, including Caryl Churchill's Cloud Nine and Larry Kramer's The Normal Heart. She appeared opposite Kevin Kline in the New York Shakespeare Festival's Richard III (winning New York's Bayfield Shakespearean award for her performance) and starred with David Bowie in the Broadway production of The Elephant Man, continuing in the national tour.

In the 1980s, she moved to California and appeared in many regional theatres, including Los Angeles' Mark Taper Forum, the Oregon Contemporary Theatre, and San Francisco's ACT. She was a regular cast member in the TV-series China Beach, which ran from 1988 to 1991. She was also in the cast of the short-lived "Madman of the People" (1994–95). She appeared in recurring roles in several TV series, including L.A. Law, Falcon Crest, Picket Fences, Max Headroom, and Judging Amy. She also appeared in the films Murder in Three Acts (1986), The Betty Ford Story (1987) and In Love and War (1987).

In 1991 and 1994, Tomei guest appeared in Season 3 Episode 10 of the TV sitcom Wings titled "The Late Mrs. Biggins,” and Season 5 Episode 21, titled “Roy Crazy”; in both episodes, she played the former wife of Roy Biggins. In 1991, she also had the role of Mrs. Crandell in the cult film Don't Tell Mom the Babysitter's Dead. She starred in the 1992 miniseries The Burden of Proof. In 1997 she portrayed Minister Odala in Star Trek: Voyager episode Distant Origin. From 1999 to 2002, Tomei appeared in 63 episodes of the NBC television series Providence, costarring with Melina Kanakaredes and Mike Farrell. In 2005, Tomei guest appeared in an episode of The King of Queens. One year later, in 2006, she returned to Off-Broadway with an acclaimed performance in Sarah Ruhl's The Clean House. In 2007 she appeared opposite Kevin Kline and Jennifer Garner in a Broadway production of the play Cyrano de Bergerac., which was also recorded and broadcast on PBS's Great Performances in 2009.

From 1997 to 2011, Tomei played guest roles on TV shows, such as 7th Heaven, Touched by an Angel, Second Time Around, The King of Queens, Weeds, Numb3rs, Kitchen Confidential, The Closer, Cold Case, Ghost Whisperer, Nip/Tuck, Rubicon, Necessary Roughness, and Star Trek: Voyager.

In 2017, she appeared in two episodes of The Mick titled "The Grandparents" & "The Matriarch" , as Tippy Pemberton, the twisted, abusive grandmother of Sabrina, Chip and Ben.

Filmography

Film

Television

References

External links
 
 
 Concetta Tomei discusses animal rescues at Pet360 
 Concetta Tomei reflects on her years working on the television series China Beach during the show's 25th anniversary reunion at the Paley Center
 Interview with Concetta Tomei at Talkin' Broadway

1945 births
American film actresses
American stage actresses
American television actresses
Living people
Actors from Kenosha, Wisconsin
Actresses from Wisconsin
21st-century American women